Raúl Maroto (born 5 September 1965) is a Spanish fencer. He competed in the épée events at the 1988, 1992 and 1996 Summer Olympics.

References

External links
 

1965 births
Living people
Spanish male épée fencers
Olympic fencers of Spain
Fencers at the 1988 Summer Olympics
Fencers at the 1992 Summer Olympics
Fencers at the 1996 Summer Olympics
Fencers from Madrid